Brenden Santi (born 5 August 1993) is an Italy international rugby league footballer who plays as a  or  for the Keighley Cougars in the Championship. 

He previously played for the Wests Tigers in the NRL.self proclaimed best tigers forward in the nrl era

Background
Santi was born in Bankstown, New South Wales, Australia and is of Italian descent. 

He played his junior rugby league for the Chester Hill Hornets before being signed by the Canterbury-Bankstown Bulldogs.

Playing career
In 2010, Santi was a part of the Canterbury-Bankstown Bulldogs' NYC squad but didn't play a game. He joined the Wests Tigers and played for their NYC team from 2011 to 2013.

During his initial period with the Wests Tigers, Santi captained the Australian Schoolboys in 2011, and played in the Tigers' 2012 NYC Grand Final win over the Canberra Raiders. He also played for the New South Wales Under 20s team, winning the Players' Player award. At the end of 2013, Santi played for Italy at the 2013 Rugby League World Cup, playing three games from the bench.

Santi signed a 2-year contract with the Parramatta Eels starting in 2014. Coach Ricky Stuart said, "Brenden ticks a lot of boxes in regards to the type of player we want to build our club around - no nonsense and tough with a high work rate."

By the start of 2014, Stuart had been replaced as Eels coach by Brad Arthur. On 8 May 2014, Santi returned to the Wests Tigers mid-season on a contract to the end of 2015. Santi said, "I did what most young kids would do and left [Wests Tigers] for an opportunity. I wasn't filthy, because they had a lot of quality first graders in front of me. I got bought by Ricky Stuart, [but] Brad Arthur had other plans at Parramatta. And I don't think I was in them."

In Round 25 of the 2014 NRL season, Santi made his NRL debut for the Tigers against the Canberra Raiders, in what was his only appearance for the season.

Santi played in 10 games in 2015, all from the bench. He was not re-signed at the end of the season.

In 2016, he joined the Townsville Blackhawks in the Queensland Cup. At the end of the 2016 season, he joined the Sydney Roosters for 2017. In October, he represented Italy at the 2017 Rugby League World Cup.

In 2018, Santi re-joined the Townsville Blackhawks, after spending the entire 2017 season playing for the Roosters' feeder club, the Wyong Roos, in the New South Wales Cup.

On 21 December 2019, Santi signed for the Newcastle Thunder for the 2020 League 1 season.

On 30 October 2020 it was announced that Santi would join Keighley Cougars for the 2021 season  At the end of the 2021 season Santi signed a two year contract extension with Keighley tying him to the club until the end of the 2023 season.

Santi was named in the Italian squad for the 2021 Rugby League World Cup.

References

External links

2017 RLWC profile
Italy profile

1993 births
Living people
Australian rugby league players
Australian people of Italian descent
Balmain Ryde-Eastwood Tigers players
Keighley Cougars players
Italy national rugby league team captains
Italy national rugby league team players
Newcastle Thunder players
Rugby league locks
Rugby league second-rows
Rugby league players from Sydney
Toulouse Olympique players
Townsville Blackhawks players
Wentworthville Magpies players
Wests Tigers players
Wyong Roos players